Athletics at the 1964 Summer Paralympics consisted of 42 events, 24 for men and 18 for women.

Participating nations

Medal table

Medal summary

Men's events

Women's events

References 

 

 
1964 Summer Paralympics events
1964
Paralympics